Rover Records is a Canadian independent record label founded in 1993. The company was developed to produce musical releases of The Irish Rovers, the well-known Canadian Irish folk group created in 1963. The record label is owned and operated by Irish Rovers founding member, George Millar.
Most albums/CDs are recorded at Island Pacific Studios, Nanaimo, British Columbia, Canada and
Emerald Studios in Belfast, N. Ireland, and mixed in Nanaimo, British Columbia.

Album List 
Whiskey in the jar
Celebrate! The First Thirty Years (1994)
The Next Thirty Years (1995)
Irish Rovers Gems (1996)
Come Fill Up Your Glasses (1998)
Songs of Christmas (1999)
Down By The Lagan Side (2000)
Another Round (2002)
Live in Concert (2003)
40 Years A-Rovin''' (2003)Still Rovin' After All These Years (2007)Gracehill Fair (2010)Home In Ireland (2011)Merry Merry Time Of Year (2011)Drunken Sailor'' (2012)

Canadian independent record labels
Record labels established in 1993